The Mỹ Đình National Stadium is a multi-use stadium in Nam Từ Liêm, Hanoi (Vietnam). It has a capacity of 40,192 seats and is the centerpiece of Vietnam's National Sports Complex. It was officially opened in September 2003 and was the main venue for the Southeast Asian Games later that year, hosting the opening and closing ceremony as well as the men's football and athletics events.

The stadium is home to the Vietnam national football team, and hosts its home international friendly matches. It was also home to Thể Công.

Located 10 kilometres north-west of central Hanoi, the 40,192-seat stadium is the second biggest in the country in terms of capacity and was built at a cost of US$53 million. Arched roofs cover the grandstands on the east and west sides of the arena, providing shelter for half of the seats. The area provides training facilities for the teams with two football training grounds located next to the stadium. 

From 2021 onwards, the stadium has attracted complaints, especially about the state of the pitch, starting with its hosting of the Vietnam - Australia match in the third AFC qualification round of the 2022 World Cup. It has since come under more scrutiny when hosting Borussia Dortmund in an international friendly where the goal post was embarrassingly broken mid-game and South East Asian teams in the 2022 AFF Championship.

History
Ideas for a new national stadium in Vietnam were marked up in 1998 as the government conducted a prefeasibility study for a national sports complex. In July 2000, Vietnamese Prime Minister Phan Văn Khải approved a project of a stadium at the heart of Vietnam's National Sports Complex in preparation for hosting the 2003 Southeast Asian Games. Four firms, namely Hanoi International Group (HISG - China), Philipp Holzmann (Germany), Bouygues (France), and Lemna-Keystone (United States), participated in the bidding of the stadium's construction. The process was controversial due to violations of technical and financial requirements in HISG and Holzmann's bids, corruption allegations involving a French donation, and the intransparency in the panel's decision making. In the end, HISG won the bid and signed a commitment contract on August 14, 2001.

Construction on the stadium started in 2002. During the developmental phase, the stadium was referred to as Sân vận động Trung tâm ("central stadium"). The stadium was architecturally complete in June 2003. In August 2003, the stadium was officially named Mỹ Đình National Stadium, taking after the name of the commune area the stadium is located within. It was inaugurated on September 2, 2003, to coincide with Vietnam's National Day.

Interior

Stands
Mỹ Đình has 4 stands. The A & B stands (or east and west stands, respectively) are covered each by an arched roof weighing 2,300 tonnes. In total, the stadium has a capacity of 40,192 seats, including 450 VIP seats and 160 seats for journalists.

Field
The playing grass field has a size of 105m x 67m, surrounded by an 8-lane athletics track and other athletics facilities.

Events

Sporting events

The stadium officially opened on September 2, 2003, with the opening friendly match between the Vietnam U23 and Shanghai Shenhua from Chinese Super League.

It hosted the 2003 Southeast Asian Games (opening ceremony, football and athletics, closing ceremony), and 2003 ASEAN Para Games.

The Hanoi football club was scheduled to play at the stadium, but later backed out of their agreement, citing the embarrassment of using an 40,000+ seat venue for games that routinely draw only slightly more than 5,000.

In July 2007, Mỹ Đình Stadium hosted the Group B of 2007 AFC Asian Cup along with Quân khu 7 Stadium (Ho Chi Minh City), quarter-final match (Japan vs Australia) and semi-final match (Japan vs Saudi Arabia).

Mỹ Đình Stadium held the opening ceremony of the 2009 Asian Indoor Games from October 30, 2009, to November 8.

In December 2010, it held Group B of 2010 AFF Suzuki Cup from December 2 to December 8.

The stadium hosted 2021 Southeast Asian Games for (opening ceremony, football and athletics)

In addition, this stadium held many domestic and international football competitions:

 2008 AFC Champions League (Nam Định selected this stadium as their own Thiên Trường Stadium did not meet AFC criteria)
 2008 The stadium held an international friendly match between Vietnam and Olympic Brazil
 2010 VFF Cup
 2011 V-League (25th round match between Hà Nội ACB and Sông Lam Nghệ An)
 2011 VFF Cup
 2012 Football at the Summer Olympics – Men's Asian Qualifiers Playoff Round
The three runners-up from the third round groups played each other at a neutral venue on 25, 27 and 29 March 2012. Vietnam was later chosen by the AFC Competitions Committee as the neutral venue, with games played at Hanoi's Mỹ Đình Stadium.
 On 17 July 2013, the stadium held an international friendly match between Vietnam and Arsenal.
 On 27 July 2015, the stadium held an international friendly match between Vietnam and Manchester City.
 On September 7, 2021, the stadium hosted the first match in the 2022 FIFA World Cup qualification – AFC Third Round between Vietnam and Australia. This is also the first time VAR and Goal-line have been applied in Vietnam (made by Hawk-Eye Innovations Ltd).
 On 30 November 2022, the stadium held an international friendly match between Vietnam and Borussia Dortmund, which was saw a shock win 2-1 of the host with the 2nd placed team of Bundesliga in the 2021-22 season after a controversal second goal in the last minutes of the match.
Vietnam women's national football team  hasn't played any matches since the opening of the stadium.

Entertainment events

Mỹ Đình National Stadium has hosted many entertainment events. On January 10, 2010, VTV held a concert featuring local famous singers. On March 27, 2010, a MTV Exit concert was held here with the appearance of Super Junior, a Korean boyband, Kate Miller, an Australian singer along with many Vietnamese singers. Recently, on October 1, 2011, the Irish boyband Westlife put a stop here as a part of their Gravity Tour; about 11,000 people attended the concert. The stadium was also the starting line of The Amazing Race Vietnam 2012. On May 26, 2013, MTV Exit held a concert featuring the Canadian pop punk band Simple Plan to raise awareness about human trafficking and modern slavery.

The stadium has also been the venue for various K-pop concerts. It was the venue for a special concert of MBC's Music Core on December 8, 2012, KBS's Music Bank World Tour on March 28, 2015, and KCON on December 20 and 21, 2022.

Tournament results
The stadium has hosted several international FIFA matches. Here is a list of the most important international matches held at the Mỹ Đình Stadium.

2003 Southeast Asian Games

2004 AFF Championship

2007 AFF Championship

2007 AFC Asian Cup

2008 AFF Championship

2010 AFF Championship

2014 AFF Championship

2018 FIFA World Cup qualification (AFC)

2016 AFF Championship

2018 AFF Championship

2022 FIFA World Cup qualification (AFC)

2021 Southeast Asian Games

2022 AFF Championship

Concerts

See also
List of stadiums by capacity

References

External links
 SÂN VẬN ĐỘNG QUỐC GIA MỸ ĐÌNH (MY DINH NATIONAL STADIUM)
 

Sports venues completed in 2003
Football venues in Vietnam
AFC Asian Cup stadiums
Athletics (track and field) venues in Vietnam
Stadiums in Hanoi
Vietnam
2003 establishments in Vietnam
Multi-purpose stadiums in Vietnam
Southeast Asian Games stadiums
Southeast Asian Games athletics venues
Southeast Asian Games football venues